The Miss Chinese International Pageant 2006 was held on January 21, 2006 in Hong Kong.  The pageant was organized and broadcast by TVB in Hong Kong. At the end of the event, Miss Chinese International 2005 Leanne Li of Vancouver, British Columbia, Canada crowned Ina Lu of Johannesburg, South Africa as the new Miss Chinese International.

Pageant information 
The theme to this year's pageant is "Millions of Colours, The Most Beautiful Chinese" 「萬千色彩  最美華裔」. The Masters of Ceremonies include Eric Tsang, Sammy Leung, and Derek Li.  Special performing guest were cantopop singers Justin Lo and Kenny Kwan. The delegate from Montréal, (11) Vicki Ng-Wan withdrew from competition. The competition this year marked the lowest contestant turnout until 2013, with only 17 delegates competing, including one who withdrew from competition. The 2016 pageant currently has the lowest contestant count with 14.

The promotional advertisement for this pageant, entitled "Eternal Beauty" (絕色篇) starring Fala Chen won the Best Promotional Clip Award at the TVB Anniversary Awards 2006.

Results

Special awards 
Miss Friendship: Annabelle Kong 江佩瑩 (Kuala Lumpur)
Miss Young: Ginney Kanchanawat 許裕娟 (Bangkok)

Contestant list 

* withdrew from competition

Crossovers
Contestants who previously competed or will be competing at other international beauty pageants:

Miss World
 2005: : Tracy Ip

External links 
 Miss Chinese International Pageant 2006 Official Site

TVB
2006 beauty pageants
2006 in Hong Kong
Beauty pageants in Hong Kong
Miss Chinese International Pageants